Zdravko Simeonov (born 17 July 1946) is a Bulgarian volleyball player. He competed at the 1968 Summer Olympics and the 1972 Summer Olympics.

References

1946 births
Living people
Bulgarian men's volleyball players
Olympic volleyball players of Bulgaria
Volleyball players at the 1968 Summer Olympics
Volleyball players at the 1972 Summer Olympics
People from Pernik